Phyllodesmium guamense is a species of sea slug, an aeolid nudibranch, a marine gastropod mollusc in the family Facelinidae.

The specific name guamense refers to the island of Guam, its type locality.

Distribution 
The type locality of Phyllodesmium guamense is Piti, Guam, Micronesia. Additional specimens were found in Cocos Island Lagoon nearby.

Description 
Phyllodesmium guamense uses camouflage and it looks like the soft coral Sinularia. The maximum recorded length of the slug is 48 mm. This species contains zooxanthellae which are distributed throughout the inflated cerata.

Ecology 
Phyllodesmium guamense feeds on Sinularia polydactyla, Sinularia maxima and Sinularia sp.

References

Facelinidae
Gastropods described in 1998
Fauna of Micronesia